Young People's Poet Laureate is a position and award that was established by the Poetry Foundation in 2006. The position is to promote children's poetry in the United States. The organization changed the name from Children's Poet Laureate to capture a broader range of ages.

Laureates

References 

American poetry awards
Children's poets
Children's literary awards
Young adult literature awards
Poetry Foundation